A Dog Named Christmas is a 2009 American/Canadian television film that debuted on CBS as a Hallmark Hall of Fame movie on November 29, 2009. The film was produced by Brent Shields, directed by Peter Werner and written by Jenny Wingfield, who based the script from a novel of the same name by Greg Kincaid.

Plot
A tale of a young man with a learning disability, named Todd McCray (Noel Fisher) living with his parents in the rural midwest. The story takes place over a two-week period over the Christmas holidays when the local animal shelter
launches an "Adopt a dog for Christmas" program. Todd's unconditional love for animals enables him to embark on an endeavour to ensure that as many dogs as possible get adopted by the local community.

One dog in particular has grabbed Todd's heart and through intermittent flashbacks, viewers slowly discover the reasons for his father's reluctance to fully support Todd's efforts.

Cast
 Linda Emond as Mary Ann McCray
 Noel Fisher as Todd McCray
 Bruce Greenwood as George McCray
 Carrie Genzel as Brianna Lewis
 Trenna Keating as Faye McCray

Production
A Dog Named Christmas is the 237th presentation by Hallmark Hall of Fame, the long-running anthology program of American television films. It was based on a novel of the same name by Greg Kincaid, which was published in 2008. He wrote the story almost ten years prior for his wife, Michale Ann, and his five children, who ranged in age from 9 to 13. Kincaid said his family hated the original story, particularly because of the unhappy ending. Kincaid rewrote the story over the next year, with a new ending that his family liked better. He named a character in the story after each of his children.

The novel was fast-tracked into a film production in January 2009. During the film's original broadcast on CBS on November 29, 2009, the network sponsored a nationwide "Foster a Lonely Pet" program with Petfinder.com, an online database of adoptable pets, which included more than 2,000 shelters and animal-rescue groups across North America. After the end credits, a public service announcement was aired featuring Greg Kincaid describing the promotion.

Reception
In its original American broadcast on November 29, 2009, A Dog Named Christmas was seen by 18.7 million households, according to the Nielsen ratings. In the ratings, the movie outperformed NBC's Sunday Night Football broadcast of the NFL game between the Pittsburgh Steelers and the Baltimore Ravens, which drew 17.3 million households. It was also seen by more households than CBS's 60 Minutes at 14.3 million and ABC's Desperate Housewives at 12.6 million, and outperformed Fox's The Simpsons (9 million) and Family Guy (8.5 million).

Location
The movie was shot in the Southey and Earl Grey area, located in Saskatchewan, Canada.

Prequel
In 2013 a made-for-television prequel to A Dog Named Christmas was released. It is entitled Christmas with Tucker and based on a book with the same name by Greg Kincaid. Gage Munroe plays young George McCray while James Brolin and Barbara Gordon play his grandparents, Bo and Cora McCray. Filmed in  Northern Ontario, Canada, Christmas with Tucker is about thirteen-year-old George coping with the death of his father. He is helped through his struggles by his friendship with a dog named Tucker.

See also
 List of Christmas films

References

External links
 
 
 CBS Hallmark Hall of Fame presentation of A Dog Named Christmas
 
 A Dog Named Christmas official book website

2009 television films
2009 films
American Christmas films
Canadian Christmas films
English-language Canadian films
Christmas television films
Films based on American novels
Films shot in Saskatchewan
Hallmark Hall of Fame episodes
Films about dogs
Films about pets
Films directed by Peter Werner
Films scored by Jeff Beal
2000s Christmas films